Handfuls of Sky is the second studio album from Australian singer songwriter Harmony James, first released on a major label, Warner Music Australia.

The album features stellar contributions by Troy Cassar Daley, Bill Chambers and The McClymonts.

Kim Cheshire from Country Update magazine wrote "The songwriting and vocals are much more mature and assured, the production warmer and a little more adventurous, and there's absolutely nothing here that's going to sway me from my opening salvo, she's still the best country songwriter we’ve got and as far as I can see she's still racing way ahead of the pack".

Track listing 

 Produced and engineered by Herm Kovac

Personnel 
 Glen Wilson: drums
 Ian Lees: bass
 Glenn Hannah:electric guitars, mando guitar
 Stuart French:acoustic guitars, electric guitars
 James Gillard: acoustic guitars, bass guitar, backing vocals
 Michel Rose: dobro, mandolin
 Tim Crouch: fiddle, mandolin, cello
 Rod McCormack: banjo
 Bill Risby: piano
 Mark Punch: backing vocals
 Bill Chambers:electric guitar, lap steel, backing vocals
 Shane Nicholson: resonator guitar, duet on Reach For Me
 Troy Cassar- Daley: harmonica, banjo, backing vocals
 The McClymonts:backing vocals
 Hank Kovac: percussion
 Jesse Kovac: big drum, handclaps

References 
 Country Update
 Sydney Morning Herald

Harmony James albums
Warner Music Australasia albums
2012 albums